Protein disulfide-isomerase A3 (PDIA3), also known as glucose-regulated protein, 58-kD (GRP58), is an isomerase enzyme. This protein localizes to the endoplasmic reticulum (ER) and interacts with lectin chaperones calreticulin and calnexin (CNX) to modulate folding of newly synthesized glycoproteins. It is thought that complexes of lectins and this protein mediate protein folding by promoting formation of disulfide bonds in their glycoprotein substrates.

Structure 

The PDIA3 protein consists of four thioredoxin-like domains: a, b, b′, and a′. The a and a′ domains have Cys-Gly-His-Cys active site motifs (C57-G58-H59-C60 and C406-G407-H408-C409) and are catalytically active. The bb′ domains contain a CNX binding site, which is composed of positively charged, highly conserved residues (K214, K274, and R282) that interact with the negatively charged residues of the CNX P domain. The b′ domain comprises the majority of the binding site, but the β4-β5 loop of the b domain provides additional contact (K214) to strengthen the interaction. A transient disulfide bond forms between the N-terminal cysteine in the catalytic motif and a substrate, but in a step called "escape pathway", the bond is disrupted as the C-terminal cysteine attacks the N-terminal cysteine to release the substrate.

Function 

The PDIA3 protein is a thiol oxidoreductase that has protein disulfide isomerase activity. PDIA3 is also part of the major histocompatibility complex (MHC) class I peptide loading complex, which is essential for formation of the final antigen conformation and export from the endoplasmic reticulum to the cell surface. This protein of the endoplasmic reticulum interacts with lectin chaperones such as calreticulin and CNX in order to modulate the folding of proteins that are newly synthesized. It is believed that PDIA3 plays a role in protein folding by promoting the formation of disulfide bonds, and that CNX facilitates the positioning substrates next to the catalytic cysteines. This function allows it to serve as a redox sensor by activating mTORC1, which then mediates mTOR complex assembly to adapt cells to oxidative damage. Thus, PDIA3 regulates cell growth and death according to oxygen concentrations, such as in the hypoxic microenvironment of bones. Additionally, PDIA3 activates cell anchorage in bones by associating with cell division and cytoskeleton proteins, such as beta-actin and vimentin, to form a complex which controls TUBB3 folding and proper attachment of the microtubules to the kinetochore. PDIA3 also plays a role in cytokine-dependent signal transduction, including STAT3 signaling.

PDIA3 may also participate in Vitamin D (specifically, calcitriol) signaling as a membrane-bound receptor.

Clinical significance 

It has been demonstrated that the downregulation of ERp57 expression is correlated with poor prognosis in early-stage cervical cancer. It has also been demonstrated that ERp57/PDIA3 binds specific DNA fragments in a melanoma cell line. PDIA3 is also involved in bone metastasis, which is the most common source of distant relapse in breast cancer. In addition to cancer, overexpression of PDIA3 is linked to renal fibrosis, which is characterized by excess synthesis and secretion of ECM leading to ER stress.

Interactions 

It has been demonstrated that PDIA3 interacts with: 
BACE1, 
ERp27,
tapasin,
CRT, and 
CNX.

See also 
 Antigen processing 
 Major histocompatibility complex

References

External links 
 

EC 5.3.4
Molecular chaperones
Endoplasmic reticulum resident proteins